Brian Leeds DeMarco is a physicist and Professor of Physics at the University of Illinois at Urbana-Champaign.  In 2005 he placed first in the quantum physics portion of the "Amazing Light" competition honoring Charles Townes, winner of the 1964 Nobel Prize in Physics.  DeMarco is currently conducting experiments in quantum simulation.

DeMarco earned a bachelor's degree in physics from the State University of New York at Geneseo in 1996.  He then earned a PhD in physics from the University of Colorado at Boulder in 2001.  As a graduate student, DeMarco worked with Deborah S. Jin to create the first true Fermionic condensate.  The journal Science selected this achievement as one of the top ten scientific discoveries of 1999.

From 2001–2003, DeMarco was a postdoctoral research fellow at the National Institute of Standards and Technology (Boulder), working on quantum computing experiments with trapped atomic ions.  He joined the Department of Physics at the University of Illinois in 2003.

Education
Vestal Senior High School, Vestal NY Class of 1992
SUNY Geneseo, Geneseo, NY Class of 1996
University of Colorado at Boulder, Boulder, Colorado Ph.D. in Physics 2001

Honors and awards
Breakthrough of the Year, 1999 - Science magazine - Science 286, 2239-2243 (1999)
JILA Scientific Achievement Award, 2000
American Physical Society DAMOP Dissertation Award, 2002
Office of Naval Research Young Investigator Program Award, 2004
National Science Foundation CAREER Award, 2004
1st Place, "Quantum Physics" category, Amazing Light: Visions for Discovery, 2005
Alfred P. Sloan Foundation Research Fellowship, 2006
Beckman Fellow, 2006-2007
Fellow of the American Physical Society, 2015

Publications

References

External links
DeMarco home page
Amazing Light Competition
Physics Illinois News

21st-century American physicists
Science teachers
University of Colorado alumni
University of Illinois Urbana-Champaign faculty
Living people
Year of birth missing (living people)
State University of New York at Geneseo alumni
Fellows of the American Physical Society